Simon Önerud (born June 16, 1988) is a  Swedish professional ice hockey player. He is currently playing with HV71 in the Swedish Hockey League (SHL). He has formerly played with Timrå IK and Modo Hockey in the SHL.

Playing career
In the 2016–17 season, Önerud was amongst the team's leaders in offense. He contributed with 29 points in 37 games and 13 points in 16 post-season games to help lead HV71 to their 5th Le Mat Trophy. He was awarded with the Stefan Liv Memorial Trophy as the league's MVP in the post-season. A week after claiming the Championship, Önerud opted for a release from his contract with HV71 to become a free agent in order to pursue a new challenge in the KHL. On May 26, 2017, Önerud was announced to be the final foreign signing for HC Sochi on a one-year agreement.

After spending the 2017–18 season in the Kontinental Hockey League (KHL), split between HC Sochi and HC Sibir Novosibirsk, Önerud returned to the SHL, rejoining HV71, on a three-year contract on May 18, 2018.

Awards and honors

References

External links
 

1988 births
Living people
Swedish ice hockey left wingers
HV71 players
Modo Hockey players
IK Oskarshamn players
HC Sibir Novosibirsk players
HC Sochi players
Timrå IK players
IF Troja/Ljungby players
Sportspeople from Jönköping